John F. Reif (born June 19, 1951) is a former justice of the Oklahoma Supreme Court, serving from 2007 until he retired in 2009. Previously, he had served for 20 years on the Oklahoma Court of Civil Appeals.

Early life and career
Reif was born in Skiatook, Oklahoma, in 1951. He attended from Cascia Hall Preparatory School, a Roman Catholic school in Tulsa, and graduated as valedictorian of his class in 1969. Reif earned both his bachelor's degree (in Criminal Justice) and his J.D. degree from the University of Tulsa, in 1973 and 1977, respectively.

Reif worked as a police officer in Owasso, Oklahoma, from 1973 to 1975 and as a Planner and Grants Specialist for the Law Enforcement Assistance Administration of the Indian Nations Council of Governments (INCOG) from 1974 to 1977. After finishing law school, Reif was an assistant district attorney for Tulsa County, Oklahoma, from 1978 until his appointment as a Special District Judge for Oklahoma's Fourteenth Judicial District in Tulsa County, Oklahoma, in 1981.

Reif served as a Special District Judge from 1981 to 1984, when he was appointed to the Oklahoma Court of Civil Appeals. He spent more than 20 years on that court until his appointment to the Oklahoma Supreme Court in 2007, twice serving as both Vice Chief Judge (1993 and 2001) and Chief Judge (1994 and 2002).

Throughout his time on the Court of Civil Appeals, Reif also worked as an adjunct professor of business law at Oral Roberts University.

Supreme Court Justice
Reif was appointed to the Oklahoma Supreme Court by Governor Brad Henry on October 22, 2007, filling a vacancy created by the retirement of Justice Robert E. Lavender.

Reif served a two-year term as Chief Justice of the Oklahoma Supreme Court in 2015 and 2016 and was replaced in that position by Justice Douglas Combs, who had served as his Vice Chief Justice. In March 2019 Reif announced his voluntary retirement from the court, effective April 30, 2019.

Personal life
Reif was married to the former Aylo Brewer for 35 years from 1973 until her death in 2008.

Awards
Oral Roberts University, President's Distinguished Service Award, 1995
Oklahoma Bar Association (OBA), Earl Sneed Award, in recognition of annual presentations at OBA-sponsored continuing legal education and community education programs over the previous 30 years, 2010

Professional organizations
 Oklahoma Bar Association, 1978 to present

References

External links
Gov. Henry appoints Reif to Supreme Court
OSCN Reif biography

1951 births
Living people
Justices of the Oklahoma Supreme Court
Oklahoma state court judges
Oral Roberts University faculty
University of Tulsa alumni
University of Tulsa College of Law alumni
Lawyers from Tulsa, Oklahoma
Chief Justices of the Oklahoma Supreme Court
21st-century American judges